Inga is a genus of moths of the family Oecophoridae.

Species
Inga analis (Busck, 1914)
Inga ancorata (Walsingham, 1912)
Inga brevisella (Walker, 1864)
Inga callierastis (Meyrick, 1920)
Inga calycocentra (Meyrick, 1931)
Inga camelopis (Meyrick, 1920)
Inga canariella (Busck, 1908)
Inga cancanodes (Meyrick, 1918)
Inga catasticta (Meyrick, 1920)
Inga caumatias (Meyrick, 1929)
Inga cerophaea (Meyrick, 1914)
Inga chlorochroa (Meyrick, 1912)
Inga ciliella (Busck, 1908)
Inga cnecodes (Meyrick, 1920)
Inga concinna (Meyrick, 1912)
Inga concolorella (Beutenmüller, 1888)
Inga conserva (Meyrick, 1914)
Inga corystes (Meyrick, 1914)
Inga cretacea (Zeller, 1873)
Inga crossota (Walsingham, 1912)
Inga crucifera (Busck, 1914)
Inga cupidinea (Meyrick, 1914)
Inga custodita (Meyrick, 1928)
Inga cyclophthalma (Meyrick, 1916)
Inga deligata (Meyrick, 1914)
Inga dilecta (Meyrick, 1920)
Inga distorta (Meyrick, 1920)
Inga elaphodes (Meyrick, 1930)
Inga empyrea (Meyrick, 1920)
Inga encamina (Meyrick, 1912)
Inga entaphrota (Meyrick, 1915)
Inga erasicosma (Meyrick, 1916)
Inga eriocnista (Meyrick, 1931)
Inga erotias (Meyrick, 1912)
Inga erythema (Walsingham, 1912)
Inga fervida (Zeller, 1855)
Inga flava (Zeller, 1839)
Inga fundigera (Meyrick, 1912)
Inga furva (Meyrick, 1916)
Inga genuina (Meyrick, 1914)
Inga haemataula (Meyrick, 1912)
Inga halosphora (Meyrick, 1916)
Inga helobia (Meyrick, 1931)
Inga hyperbolica (Meyrick, 1928)
Inga icterota (Meyrick, 1914)
Inga incensatella (Walker, 1864)
Inga inflammata (Meyrick, 1916)
Inga iracunda (Meyrick, 1914)
Inga lacunata (Meyrick, 1914)
Inga languida (Meyrick, 1912)
Inga leptophragma (Meyrick, 1920)
Inga libidinosa (Meyrick, 1926)
Inga loxobathra (Meyrick, 1915)
Inga meliacta (Meyrick, 1914)
Inga mercata (Meyrick, 1914)
Inga mimobathra (Meyrick, 1920)
Inga mixadelpha (Meyrick, 1914)
Inga molifica (Meyrick, 1914)
Inga molybdopa (Meyrick, 1920)
Inga mydopis (Meyrick, 1914)
Inga neospila (Meyrick, 1928)
Inga obscuromaculella (Chambers, 1878)
Inga orthodoxa (Meyrick, 1912)
Inga orthophragma (Meyrick, 1916)
Inga pachybathra (Meyrick, 1921)
Inga pagana (Meyrick, 1916)
Inga pagidotis (Meyrick, 1918)
Inga percnorma (Meyrick, 1930)
Inga pericyclota (Meyrick, 1920)
Inga perioditis (Meyrick, 1928)
Inga petasodes (Meyrick, 1914)
Inga phaeocrossa (Meyrick, 1912)
Inga plectanota (Meyrick, 1918)
Inga porpotis (Meyrick, 1914)
Inga proditrix Hodges, 1974
Inga pyrothyris (Meyrick, 1916)
Inga pyrrhoxantha (Meyrick, 1931)
Inga refuga (Meyrick, 1916)
Inga rhodoclista (Meyrick, 1916)
Inga rimatrix Hodges, 1974
Inga rosea (Meyrick, 1920)
Inga roseomarginella (Busck, 1911)
Inga ruricola (Meyrick, 1914)
Inga satura (Meyrick, 1914)
Inga sciocrates (Meyrick, 1929)
Inga sciotoxa (Meyrick, 1914)
Inga semotella (Meyrick, 1921)
Inga separatella (Walker, 1864)
Inga signifera (Meyrick, 1914)
Inga sodalis (Walsingham, 1912)
Inga sparsiciliella (Clemens, 1864)
Inga speculatrix (Meyrick, 1914)
Inga staphylitis (Meyrick, 1916)
Inga stativa (Meyrick, 1920)
Inga stereodesma (Meyrick, 1916)
Inga taboga (Busck, 1914)
Inga textrina (Meyrick, 1914)
Inga thermoxantha (Meyrick, 1914)
Inga trailii (Butler, 1877)
Inga trifurcata (Meyrick, 1918)
Inga trygaula (Meyrick, 1912)
Inga tubicen (Meyrick, 1921)
Inga versatilis (Meyrick, 1921)
Inga virginia (Busck, 1914)
Inga voluptaria (Meyrick, 1914)

References

Markku Savela's ftp.funet.fi

 
Oecophorinae